This is a timeline of online work-focused networking service LinkedIn.

Big picture

Full timeline

See also
 Timeline of social media

References

LinkedIn